The Freikorps Sauerland (Free Corps of Sauerland), was a paramilitary association created by  Gauleiter Albert Hoffmann in September 1944. The name was taken from the  nationalist free corps active during the unrest immediately after World War One. In October, the Freikorps was officially established, and accepted by the Party Chancellery of Nazi Germany, where Martin Bormann, head of the Volkssturm associated the Freikorps to his services, as they often completed tasks, missions, etc. with them in the final months of the war. Hoffmann saw the Freikorps Sauerland as an "elite unit" in his Gau Westfalen-Süd campaigns against Allied Forces (notably, this is also where Albert Hoffmann had served as the Gauleiter before war had broken out). Only volunteers were accepted.

The Freikorps fought on the Western Front towards the later half of the Second World War. In April 1945, units of the Freikorps Sauerland fighting in Ruhrkessel (the Ruhr Pocket), suffered somewhat heavy losses from Commonwealth and Allied Forces.

Members of Volkssturm (Freikorps) Sauerland were issued field grey or brown uniforms from the Organisation Todt or RAD (the National Labor Service), and fitted with standard Volkssturm rank insignia. Special insignia were established for the unit, consisting of a white cuff title bearing the inscription “Freikorps Sauerland”, a sleeve patch and a helmet decal. Preserved helmets are usually from the Luftschutz (Air Protection Service) or of the M42 type. Weapons were usually older German and foreign (Czech, Italian, French, etc.) rifles, plus the ubiquitous Panzerfaust and hand grenades.

References

Freikorps
Military units and formations established in 1944
Military units and formations disestablished in 1945